Paolo De Chiesa (born March 14, 1956) is an Italian journalist and former alpine skier who competed in the 1980 Winter Olympics and in the 1984 Winter Olympics.

De Chiesa has been a technical commentator for RAI in ski races for several years.

Biography
He was born in Saluzzo, Piedmont. De Chiesa competed in two Olympic slalom events but was not able to finish one of these races. He also scored several podium placements in the Alpine Skiing World Cup.

Journalistic career
After retiring from competitions, he devoted himself to journalism, first in Telemontecarlo and then as a contributor to various specialized magazines. Since 1993 he has been a sports commentator for Rai, for which he deals with the commentary of men's alpine skiing competitions, supporting first Furio Focolari, then Carlo Gobbo, then Davide Labate.

World Championships results

References

External links
 
  

1956 births
Living people
People from Saluzzo
Italian male alpine skiers
Italian journalists
Olympic alpine skiers of Italy
Alpine skiers at the 1980 Winter Olympics
Alpine skiers at the 1984 Winter Olympics
Universiade medalists in alpine skiing
Universiade bronze medalists for Italy
Competitors at the 1978 Winter Universiade
Alpine skiers of Fiamme Gialle
Sportspeople from the Province of Cuneo